Single Street is a hamlet in the London Borough of Bromley in Greater London, located between Luxted and Berry's Green, and centred around a street of the same name. The first record of a settlement under the name 'Single Street' is from an Ordnance Survey map in 1871, but its name is derived from sengel, an Old English word meaning 'burnt clearing'.
It is part of the largest ward in Greater London,  Darwin (ward), covering a rural area including Downe, Cudham, Leaves Green, Berry's Green, and Westerham Hill.

Partial History
Lord Simon de Manning, a former Lord of the Manor for Kevington, London, (which included Single Street, Downe, Cudham, Luxted, and Berry's Green), and grandson to Rudolf de Manning, (Count Palatine), (who married Elgida, aunt to King Harold 1, (Harold Harefoot), of England, was the royal Standard Bearer to King Richard the Lionheart. He carried the Royal Standard to Jerusalem, in 1190, during the First Crusade. 
In England, the forms Earl Palatine, and Palatine Earldom, are preferred.

Notable residents
 Nigel Farage, former MEP, leader of the Brexit Party and former chairman of EFDD in the European Parliament.

References

Districts of the London Borough of Bromley
Hamlets in the London Borough of Bromley